Li Zhangli (born July 23, 1988 in Guiyang, Guizhou) is a Chinese sprint canoeist. Li represented China at the 2012 Summer Olympics in London, where she competed in the women's K-4 500 metres, along with her teammates Yu Lamei, Liu Haiping, and Ren Wenjun. Li and her team, however, fell short in their bid for the final, as they finished last in the semi-final round by eighteen hundredths of a second (0.18) behind the Serbian team (led by Antonia Horvat-Panda), recording the slowest time of 1:34.004.

References

External links
NBC Olympics Profile

1988 births
Living people
People from Guiyang
Sportspeople from Guizhou
Chinese female canoeists
Olympic canoeists of China
Canoeists at the 2012 Summer Olympics